Seson-ji (世尊寺) is a Buddhist temple in Yoshino District, Nara Prefecture, Japan. It is affiliated with Sōtō Buddhism.

See also 
Historical Sites of Prince Shōtoku

Buddhist temples in Nara Prefecture
Prince Shōtoku